Beydağ Dam is a dam in İzmir Province, Turkey. It was built between 1994 and 2007.

See also
List of dams and reservoirs in Turkey

External links
DSI

Dams in İzmir Province
Dams completed in 2007